Tom Ballard (born 1989) is an Australian comedian, radio and television presenter.

Tom Ballard may also refer to:

 Tom Ballard (climber) (1988–2019), a British rock climber and alpinist

See also
 Tom Bollard (1890–1920), an Australian rules footballer
 Ballard (surname)